Ronald Crawford (born c.1910) is a South African former football player who played as a right back for Thames and Rotherham United in the Football League. He also played for St Johnstone and Vale of Atholl in Scotland.

References

South African soccer players
St Johnstone F.C. players
Thames A.F.C. players
Rotherham United F.C. players
English Football League players
Association football fullbacks
Possibly living people
Year of birth uncertain